The 2023 Women's Junior Pan-Am Championship is the 13th edition of the Women's Pan American Junior Championship. It is scheduled to be held from 10 to 18 April 2023 in Saint Michael, Barbados.

The tournament serves as a direct qualifier for the 2023 Junior World Cup, held in Santiago, Chile in December 2023.

Preliminary round

Pool A

Pool B

Classification round

Fifth to seventh place classification

Crossover

Fifth and sixth place

Final round

Bracket

Semi-finals

Third and fourth place

Final

References

Women's Pan-Am Junior Championship
Pan-Am Junior Championship
Pan-Am Junior Championship Women
Pan American Junior Championship
Pan American Championship
Pan American Championship
International field hockey competitions hosted by Barbados